Avillers is the name or part of the name of the following communes in France:

 Avillers, Meurthe-et-Moselle, in the Meurthe-et-Moselle department
 Avillers, Vosges, in the Vosges department
 Avillers-Sainte-Croix, in the Meuse department